The former Catholic Diocese of Lectoure was in south-west France. It existed from the fourth century until the time of the French Revolution, when it was suppressed under the Concordat of 1801. Its see was Lectoure Cathedral. Lectoure is now a commune of Gers.

Its territory was divided between the diocese of Agen and the archdiocese of Toulouse.

Bishops

To 1100
 Heuterus
 c. 506: Vigile
 c. 549: Aletius
The diocese was then for some centuries united with the diocese of Auch
 c. 990: Bernard I.
 c. 1052: Arnaud I.
 c. 1060: Johannes I.
 Raimond I.
 1061–1097: Ebbon
 1097–1103: Pierre I.

1100–1400
 1103–1118: Garcias I.
 1118–1126: Guillaume I. d'Andozile
 1126 to c. 1160: Vivien
 c. 1160–1162 or 1163: Bertrand I. de Montaut
 c. 1175 to c. 1195: Garcias II. Sanche
 1196 to c. 1205: Bernard II.
 c. 1215 to c. 1221: Arnaud II.
 c. 1229: Hugues I.
 c. 1240: Gaillard de Lambesc
 c. 1256: Géraud I.
 c. 1257: Guillaume II.
 1268 to c. 1295: Géraud de Montlezun (Geraud of Monlezun)
 c. 1296–1302: Pierre II. de Ferrières
 1303–1307: Raimond II.
 c. 1308–1330: Guillaume III. des Bordes
 c. 1336: Roger d'Armagnac
 c. 1344–1349: Arnaud III. Guillaume de La Barthe
 1350–1354: Pierre III. Anzelirii
 1365–1368: Pierre IV.
 1368–1369: Hugues II.
 1370–1371: Bernard III.
 1372 to c. 1375: Vignier
 c. 1377–1383: Bérenger
 1383: Rénier de Malent
 1383–1384: Eudes
 1384–1405: Raimond III. de Cambanilla

From 1400
 c. 1407–1416: Arnaud IV. de Peyrac
 1418–1425: Géraud III. Dupuy
 c. 1428–24 May 1449: Martin Gutteria de Pampelune
 1449–1452: Bernard IV. André
 1453–1479: Amaury
 c. 1480–1487: Hugues III. d'Espagne
 1488–1494: Pierre V. d'Abzac de La Douze
 21. December 1500 to 1505: Louis I. Pot
 1505–1508: Pierre VI. du Faur
 1509 to 17. April 1511: Bertrand II. de Lustrac
 1511–1512: Paul
 1512–1513: Guillaume IV. de Barton
 1513–1544: Jean II. de Barton (Jean Barthon de Montbas, John Barton)
 1544–1569: Guillaume V. de Barton (Guillaume Barthon de Montbas,
 1590–1594: 
 1599 to 24. March 1635: Léger de Plas
 24 March 1635 to 12 April 1646: Jean III. d'Estresse
 1646–1654: Louis II de La Rochefoucauld
 21 September 1655 to 5. January 1671: Pierre-Louis Caset de Vautorte
 1671 to 22 December 1691: Hugues de Bar
 6. April 1692 to 13. October 1717: François-Louis de Polastron
 1717–1720: Louis III. d'Illers d'Entragues
 8. January 1721 to 1745: Paul-Robert Hertault de Beaufort
 1745 to 14 May 1760: Claude-François de Narbonne-Pelet
 1760 to 26 June 1772: Pierre VII. Chapelle de Jumilhac de Cubjac
 7 September 1772 to 1790: Louis-Emmanuel de Cugnac

See also
 Catholic Church in France
 List of Catholic dioceses in France

References

Books
 pp. 548–549. (Use with caution; obsolete)
  p. 301. (in Latin)
 p. 175.

 p. 219.
 

Former Roman Catholic dioceses in France
Dioceses established in the 4th century
4th-century establishments in Roman Gaul
1801 disestablishments in France